Charles Berkeley Powell (August 19, 1858 – 1933) was an Ontario businessman and political figure. He represented the riding of Ottawa in the Legislative Assembly of Ontario from 1898 to 1904 as a Conservative member.

He was born in Port Dover, the son of Colonel Walker Powell, and educated at Galt College and McGill University. He apprenticed as a machinist with the Grand Trunk Railway and became a mechanical engineer. Powell served on the city council for Ottawa. He became a partner in the lumber firm of Pattee and Perley. He married Helen Louise Pattee.

References 
 Canadian Parliamentary Guide, 1901, AJ Magurn

External links 
Member's parliamentary history for the Legislative Assembly of Ontario

1858 births
1933 deaths
Progressive Conservative Party of Ontario MPPs
People from Norfolk County, Ontario
McGill University alumni